The Plaything is a 1929 British romance film directed by Castleton Knight and starring Estelle Brody, Heather Thatcher and Nigel Barrie. The film was a mixture of silent and sound film as it was released during the transition period following Blackmail. It was based on the play Life Is Pretty Much the Same by Arthur Jarvis Black. It was made by British International Pictures at Elstree Studios.

Cast
 Estelle Brody as Joyce Bennett 
 Heather Thatcher as Martyn Bennett 
 Nigel Barrie as Wallace McKinnel 
 Marguerite Allan as Madeleine McKinnel 
 John St. John as Claude 
 Ray Milland as Ian

References

Bibliography
 Low, Rachel. The History of British Film: Volume IV, 1918–1929. Routledge, 1997.
 Wood, Linda. British Films, 1927-1939. British Film Institute, 1986.

External links

1929 films
British romance films
British silent feature films
1929 romance films
Films directed by Castleton Knight
Films shot at British International Pictures Studios
British films based on plays
British black-and-white films
1920s English-language films
1920s British films